Crocomela imperialis is a moth of the subfamily Arctiinae. It was described by Herbert Druce in 1885. It is found in Ecuador.

References

Arctiinae
Moths described in 1885